Piotti is an Italian surname. Notable people with the surname include:

Jorge Piotti (born 1940), Argentine footballer and manager
Luigi Piotti (1913–1971), Italian racing driver
Ottorino Piotti (born 1954), Italian footballer

Italian-language surnames